The 2013–14 Wellington Phoenix FC season was the club's seventh season since its formation in 2007. It competed in the A-League for the seventh time.

Players

First-team squad

As of 6 March 2014.
Contracted Players

Reserve squad
Football School of Excellence players

Contract extensions

Transfers

Winter

In

 Brackets round club names indicate the player's contract with that club had expired before he joined Wellington Phoenix.

Out

 Brackets round a club denote the player joined that club after his Wellington Phoenix contract expired.

Loans out

Summer

In

Out

Technical staff

Statistics

Appearances

Goal scorers

Goal assists

Discipline

Goal times

Home attendance

Pre-season and friendlies

Competitions

A-League

League table

Results summary

Results by round

Matches

Notes

References

External links

2013-14
2013–14 in New Zealand association football
2013–14 A-League season by team